Past Lives is the second studio album by American pop rock band Against the Current. The album was released on September 28, 2018.

Track listing

Reception

Charts

References

2018 albums
Against the Current (band) albums
Fueled by Ramen albums